Ceceñas is a community in Cantabria, Spain. Ceceñas is the birthplace of the architect Jerónimo de la Gándara (1825-1877).

References

Populated places in Cantabria